Mohsen Alimardani (born 1968) is an Iranian conservative politician.

Alimardani was born in Zanjan. He is a member of the 9th Islamic Consultative Assembly from the electorate of Zanjan and Tarom with Mohammad Esmaeili. Alimardani won with 62,478 (30.76%) votes.

References

People from Zanjan, Iran
Deputies of Zanjan and Tarom
Living people
1968 births
Members of the 9th Islamic Consultative Assembly